The genus Dryolimnas comprises birds in the rail family. The Réunion rail, a member of this genus, became extinct in the 17th century. The white-throated rail of Aldabra is the last surviving flightless bird in the western Indian Ocean.  
They are mostly found on Malabar Island, but can also be found on Polymnieli Island and other islands.

Though much larger, the skeletons of these rails show similarities to the rails of the genus Lewinia. Therefore, the two genera were lumped at times. This has been supported by DNA evidence, which finds strong support for a clade containing Crex, Lewinina, Dryolimnas, and the Snoring rail.

Species
White-throated rail or Cuvier's rail, Dryolimnas cuvieri
Aldabra white-throated rail, Dryolimnas cuvieri aldabranus
Assumption white-throated rail, Dryolimnas cuvieri abbotti - extinct (early 20th century)
Réunion rail, Dryolimnas augusti - extinct (late 17th century)
Cheke's wood rail, Dryolimnas chekei - extinct (mid 17th century)

Notes

References

External links
https://web.archive.org/web/20070927190141/http://zipcodezoo.com/Animals/D/Dryolimnas_augusti.asp

 
Bird genera
Bird genera with one living species
Rallidae